75th Street station may refer to:

75th Street (Grand Crossing) station, a Metra station in Chicago on the Metra Electric Main Line
75th Street–Elderts Lane station, a New York City Subway station on the